Christina Giazitzidou (born 12 October 1989) is a Greek rower. She won the bronze medal (along with Alexandra Tsiavou) at the 2012 Summer Olympics in London, in the Women's lightweight double sculls.

Personal life and early career
Giazitzidou was born in Kastoria, Macedonia, Greece, where she lives till today. She turned to rowing when she was about ten years old as a member of the Nautical Club of Kastoria (which is also her current club). Her first major international competition was during the 2006 World Rowing U23 Championships which was held in Hazewinkel, Belgium.  She won bronze at the 2007 World Rowing Junior Championships in the women's quad sculls.

Later achievements
In 2009, she first competed along with Alexandra Tsiavou in Women's lightweight double sculls during 2009 World Rowing Championships in Poznań. Giazitzidou and Tsiavou won the gold medal. The following year, the Greek duo won the bronze medal in Karapiro, and in 2011 Giazitzidou and her teammate won the gold again. They also won gold in the event in the 2009, 2010 and 2011 European Championships. Giazitzidou also won the 2009, 2010 and 2011 Under-23 World Championships with Triantafyllia Kalampoka, following the pair winning the silver in 2008.  Giazitzidou won the bronze medal (along with Alexandra Tsiavou) at the 2012 Summer Olympics in London, in Women's lightweight double sculls. They won the silver medal in the same event at the 2012 European Championships.

Comeback in Greece 
Christina Giazitzidou is originally from Chionato of Akrites Municipal Unit, in her honor an event was held in the settlement and in the area a Municipal Football Field was built in her name.

References

External links
 
 
 Κωπηλασία: Χάλκινο μετάλλιο για τις Τσιάβου – Γιαζιτζίδου.

1989 births
Living people
Greek female rowers
Rowers from Kastoria
Rowers at the 2012 Summer Olympics
Olympic rowers of Greece
Olympic bronze medalists for Greece
Olympic medalists in rowing
Medalists at the 2012 Summer Olympics
World Rowing Championships medalists for Greece
European Rowing Championships medalists